Vicki Mayer is professor of Communication and Media. She currently works at Tulane University in New Orleans Louisiana, where she holds the Louise Riggio Chair for Social Entrepreneurship and Innovation. Mayer is an influential academic for her research on media production and consumption, specifically relating to economic and political transformations in creative industries. Her writings on production range from student publishing, community media, ethnic journalism and urban sign production, and have significantly contributed to the Communication School of Liberal Arts. Mayer's most downloaded article on the internet explores the origins and performance of ‘flashing’ in New Orleans.

Special Topics

Creative Labor, Hollywood South, The Public Intellectual 2.0

Professional Memberships

International Communication, Association National Communication, Association Society for Cinema and Media Studies, Latin American Studies Association

Education and Academic Career
Born in 1971, Mayer grew up in Kansas before pursuing an independent major at Brown College. She then studied at the University of California, San Diego (UCSD) and received a PhD for Communication in the year 2000. Her research interests include, but are not limited to, Media Audiences, Production Studies and Communication Labor, Citizenship and Culture, Latin American and Latino Media, and, Alternative and Community Media. Mayer is fluent in English, Portuguese and Spanish and has written four books, her most popular being Below the Line: Producers and Production Studies in the New Television Economy. She now teaches an array of courses at Tulane University including Media Analysis, Technology Analysis, Alternative Journalism and Media Histories. In these classes, her students act as co-researchers of cultural labour and creative expression in various community-based settings. Mayer's goal as an SE professor is to develop methods of bringing student and community voices into the public sphere through collaborative research, digital preservation, and open access. For this reason, Mayer directs MediaNOLA, a project that provides public access to locally based research via internet database that annually stores the class projects generated by Tulane students.

Study of the Times Picayune
In response to an announcement that New Orleans Times-Picayune were cutting printed issues to three days a week and, shifting to a more digital model of free content, Vicki Mayer and her class of Media Analysis undergraduates conducted a content analysis to compare the quality of printed and digital platforms. In this study, a 2011 edition of Times-Picayune was compared with the 2013 newspaper and allied digital platforms, namely website and smartphone applications. The content analysis involved the class studying a month of news coverage three days a week for four successive weeks in October 2011 and October 2013- approximately one year before and after the digital overhaul. The class catalogued staff-bylined articles and recorded screenshots of banner stories. This data was subsequently coded into two categories; news beats (e.g. courts, cops, politics, sports) and "hard" or "soft" news. The study demonstrated that the 2013 news operation produced a higher quantity of content than did its 2011 predecessor. Furthermore, it provided solid evidence that digital platforms produce softer, less-well-sourced, poorer quality news, even when published by the same news organisation.

Published Work 
Mayer's collaborative research is available on MediaNOLA and has been distributed through in international publications such as Jump Cut, The Columbia Journalism Review, and Public Culture. She also edits the International Journal of Television & New Media and she has both written and edited six books about media production and production studies.

Below The Line
Mayer's book Below the Line: Producers and Production Studies in the New Television Economy (Duke University Press, 2011) reflects contemporary media production studies literature, which has displayed a resurgent interest towards the labour activities of media workers. The purpose of this book is to “deconstruct the monopolies of creativity and professionalism that have structured the producer as ontologically different from all the other people who serve the television industry’s symbolic and material economies” (p. 3). In doing so, Mayer acknowledges the shifting dynamics of labour by highlighting a new media economy of workers who identify themselves within the industry, despite their work remaining ‘undervalued’ or ‘invisible’. She illuminates the “hidden labour” of individuals such as ‘soft-core’ cameramen, reality-program casters, 'do-it-yourselfers' and public-access and cable commissioners, who not only create content necessitated by the television industry, but also produce themselves in the service of capital expansion.

Mayer hereby argues that the entry of nonprofessional creative participants fail to disturb the hierarchy in which the creative professional are the referent value. She explores this notion by tracing how the “TV producer” category became associated with creativity and professionalism through four ethnographical case studies on ‘largely invisible’ television productions: i) television set assemblers in Brazil, ii) softcore video cameramen in New Orleans, iii) reality TV casters, and iv) local cable television citizen regulators. The empirical detail of these studies demonstrate labour as professional and creative work that essentially unsettles the industry's mythological account of a businesses driven by auteurs, manned by the executive class, and created by a talented minority. For this reason, Mayer's book challenges conventional paradigms that ascribe creativity and professionalism to narrow tasks performed by an elite group, fulfilling her aim to “repoliticize the ordinary” (p. 186). She subsequently critiques the self-deluding “rhetoric of the creative economy” by revealing its “implicit material inequalities” (p. 176) relating to gender, ethnicity, class, location and place, in order to demonstrate the new television economy as a wide net that exploits those excluded from hierarchies.

These conclusions reveal the paradoxical nature of the new media economy: a system that provides a wider range of access to production, whilst simultaneously offers workers less security, safeguards and stable employment. The book is hence a useful lens to demonstrate the nature of modern labourers who, in an era where work invades almost every aspect of our social life, engage with complex exercises in attempts to make themselves as ‘marketable’ as possible.

Single-Authored Books
1.     Mayer, Vicki. Almost Hollywood, Nearly New Orleans: A Film Economy Romance. Berkeley: University of California Press, 2017.

2.     Mayer, Vicki. Below the Line: Television Producers and Production Studies in the New Economy. Durham, NC: Duke University Press, 2011.

Edited or Co-Authored Books
1.     Banks, Miranda, Bridget Conor and Vicki Mayer, eds. Production Studies, The Sequel! Cultural Studies of Media Industries. New York: Routledge, 2015.

2.     Alexander, S.L., et al. The Times-Picayune in a Changing Media World: The Transformation of an American Newspaper. New York: Lexington, 2014.

Other Editorial Work
1.     Mayer, Vicki and Sonia Virginia Moreira, “Brazilian-U.S. Communication Forum.” International Journal of Communication 3 (2009): 667–714. [Edited journal issue]

References

Living people
1971 births
Tulane University faculty
Rice University alumni
University of California, San Diego alumni
Academics from Kansas
American mass media scholars
Nudity in the United States